Valigonda is a census town in Yadadri Bhuvanagiri district of the Indian state of Telangana. It is located in Valigonda mandal of Bhongir division. It is located on the banks of Musi River.

Geography
It has an average elevation of 291 metres (958 ft).

Eminent persons
 V. Eshwaraiah one of the justices of Andhra Pradesh High Court was born in Nemalikaluva village of this mandal.
 B.N.Sastry, Writer

Nearest cities
Nalgonda – 49 km, 
Hyderabad – 70 km, 
Suryapet – 82 km.

Train accident
The Valigonda rail disaster occurred on 29 October 2005 near the town of Valigonda, south of Hyderabad in the Indian state of Andhra Pradesh. A flash flood swept away a small rail bridge, and a "Delta Fast Passenger" train traveling on it derailed at the broken section of the line, killing at least 114 people and injuring over 200.

References

Mandal headquarters in Yadadri Bhuvanagiri district
Villages in Nalgonda district